"Never My Love" is a pop standard written by American siblings Don and Dick Addrisi, and best known from a hit 1967 recording by the Association. The Addrisi Brothers had two Top 40 hits as recording artists, but their biggest success as songwriters was "Never My Love". Recorded by dozens of notable artists in the decades since, in 1999 the music publishing rights organization Broadcast Music, Inc. (BMI) announced it was the second most-played song on radio and television of the 20th century in the U.S.

History
The first recording of "Never My Love" to achieve success was by the Association, an American sunshine pop band from California. Their version of the song, recorded with members of the Wrecking Crew, peaked at number two on the Billboard Hot 100 chart, kept out of the number one spot by "The Letter" by the Box Tops, and hit number one on the Cashbox charts in October 1967, one of the band's five top-ten hits in the late 1960s. Their third number 1 on the Cashbox Top 100 Singles Chart, following "Cherish" (1966) and "Windy" (1967), it was featured on the band's album Insight Out (1967). The song also reached number one in Canada's RPM charts.

By the time the Association's record was certified Gold by the RIAA for one million copies sold as of December 1967, Billboard noted that 16 artists had recorded the song.  Their third number one single had made them a top concert act and highly in demand by the TV variety series, specials, and talk shows that were a predominant format at the time, and they performed the hit on The Ed Sullivan Show, The Andy Williams Show, The Smothers Brothers Comedy Hour, The Hollywood Palace, The Dean Martin Show, Dick Clark's American Bandstand, Hullabaloo,  The Tonight Show Starring Johnny Carson, The Dick Cavett Show, The Joey Bishop Show, The Steve Allen Show, and a Carol Channing special.

Description
AllMusic's Stewart Mason wrote of the "laid-back and dreamy" single with a "sleek and sophisticated" tune that "the dual lead vocals, by Terry Kirkman and Larry Ramos, are supported by wordless harmonies as effortlessly airy as whipped cream."  Mason credited Ray Pohlman's "clever arrangement (with adding) space to the sound through juxtaposing disparate elements like the five-note bass riff that introduces the verses and the electric piano lick that ornaments the chorus, rather than jamming them on top of each other."  Mason observed that it sounded "like Pohlman had been paying particular attention to Burt Bacharach's work with Dionne Warwick, a resemblance the 5th Dimension later amplified on their cover of the song."

Personnel 
According to the Insight Out album 2011 reissue, 2002 compilation Just the Right Sound: The Association Anthology, The Association 'Cherish book, and "Never My Love" AFM contracts:The Association Terry Kirkman – lead vocals
 Larry Ramos – lead vocals
 The Association – vocalsAdditional musicians Hal Blaine – drums
 Clark Burroughs – vocal arrangement
 Al Casey – guitar
 Mike Deasy – guitar
 Bones Howe – tambourine; producer, engineer
 Larry Knechtel – electric piano, electric organ
 Joe Osborn – bass guitarSingle version overdub musicians'''

 Arthur Briegleb – french horn
 Jules Cheikin – trumpet
 Ian Freebairn-Smith – trumpet
 John T. Johnson – saxophone
 Oliver Mitchell – trumpet
 Gale Robinson – french horn
 Robert Ross – unknown

Chart history
Weekly charts
The Association

The Fifth Dimension

Blue Swede

Addrisi Brothers

Sugar Minott

Year-end charts

Notable cover versions
That cover by the American pop group the 5th Dimension was produced by the same man behind the Association's record, Bones Howe.  Recorded live in 1971, their version reached number 12 on the Hot 100 in November of that year. The recording also hit number one on the Billboard Easy Listening chart, the group's fourth to top that chart, following "Aquarius/Let the Sunshine In" (1969), "Wedding Bell Blues" (1969), and "One Less Bell to Answer" (1970). The group's version of "Never My Love"  reached number 45 on the Billboard R&B chart. This version also hit number 9 in the Canadian charts.  Allmusic's Matthew Greenwald wrote of the 5th Dimension's single, "This version, a vocal solo from Marilyn McCoo, is a great vehicle for her powerful pop voice... A song that has one of the most direct, straightforward loving messages, it remains one of the most-played and performed songs of the pop era, and for good reason."

The Swedish rock band Blue Swede covered "Never My Love" in 1974. This version peaked at number seven on the Hot 100 and remained in the Top 40 for eight weeks and was the third hit version of the song. This version reached number 7 in Canada. Their version was an upbeat take on the song.

The Addrisi Brothers themselves recorded the song three times: The first recording from 1970 remained unreleased until 2001, when Varèse Sarabande released the CD Never My Love - The Lost Album Sessions. The second recording was released as an album track on their 1972 debut album, We've Got To Get It On Again, on Columbia Records. The third recording was released in late 1977 as a single on Buddah Records, which peaked at number 80 on the Hot 100 and number 28 on Billboard Easy Listening chart and was also included on their second album, Addrisi Brothers.

Barry Manilow covered the song for his album Summer of '78 (1996). Additional versions of the song that reached the Billboard charts in the U.S. include the Sandpebbles (No. 98 pop, 1968); Vern Gosdin and Janie Fricke (No. 9 country, 1978); and Chill Factor (No. 62 R&B, 1988).

Other versions were recorded by popular artists as diverse as Hans Christian (a.k.a. Jon Anderson, later of Yes) in 1968, Booker T. & the M.G.'s, Vikki Carr, Percy Faith, Peter Nero, the Four Tops, Lou Christie, Billy Crawford, Astrud Gilberto, Etta James, Steve Lawrence, Brenda Lee, the Lennon Sisters, the Lettermen, the Sandpipers, David Hasselhoff, Pekinška Patka, Henry Mancini, Johnny Mathis, Della Reese, Smokey Robinson, Donny Hathaway, Tinkerbells Fairydust, Tom Scott, Sylvia, Cal Tjader, the Ventures, Kathy Troccoli, Andy Williams, Boris Gardiner, Sarah Vaughan, Vern Gosdin, Samantha Jones, Spencer Day and the Casuals.

The Quebec crooner Raymond Berthiaume covered "Never My Love" in French (Non, non jamais) in 1968.

Mexican band Los Freddy's covered "Never My Love" in 1968 as "Vuelve mi Amor", translated by Arturo Cisneros into Spanish.

Mercy released a version of the song on their 1969 album, Love Can Make You Happy.

In November 2013, the Japanese boy group A.B.C-Z covered the song.

In 2014, Bryan Adams recorded a version for his album Tracks of My Years.

In 2019, Jakob Dylan and Norah Jones covered the song on the Echo in the Canyon soundtrack.

Legacy
In 1999, the song was recognized as the second most-played song in history, with performances of more than seven million, according to BMI.  The number 2 rank on the Top 100 Songs of the Century, listing the most-played songs on American radio and television, placed "Never My Love" between the number 1 song "You've Lost That Lovin' Feelin'", written by Barry Mann, Phil Spector, and Cynthia Weil, and the number 3 song "Yesterday" by Lennon–McCartney.  BMI estimated that the song had received, as of 1999, what amounted to about 40 years of continuous airplay in its 32 years.

In August 2006, music critic David Raposa placed the song at number 152 on Pitchfork list of the 200 greatest songs of the 1960s, writing "While the Association's happy-together harmonies might make them seem like just another chirpy pop group aching to be hoisted upon Charles Manson's petard, there's a wispy melancholy to "Never My Love" that lifts it above the rabble. This reassuring affirmation of amour is a California dream that knows the alarm could go off at any time, which, in a world of silly love songs, makes all the difference."

Television and film
In 2020, historical drama Outlander features this song during the opening of its season 5 finale episode, the episode also being titled "Never My Love".

In 2021, the Netflix mini-series Nine Perfect Strangers featured the song during its finale.

The song appears in season 3, episode 3 of Sex Education''.

In 2021, the song is used in the Hallmark movie “Signed, Sealed, Delivered: The Vows we Have Made.”

See also
 List of Cash Box Top 100 number-one singles of 1967
 List of number-one adult contemporary singles of 1971 (U.S.)
 List of recordings of songs Hal Blaine has played on

References

1967 songs
1967 singles
1968 singles
1971 singles
1974 singles
1977 singles
1978 singles
1981 singles
1988 singles
The Association songs
The 5th Dimension songs
Blue Swede songs
Vern Gosdin songs
Song recordings produced by Bones Howe
Cashbox number-one singles
RPM Top Singles number-one singles
Warner Records singles
Bell Records singles
Addrisi Brothers songs